The Intra-European Organisation of Tax Administrations (IOTA), is a non-profit intergovernmental organisation, which provides a forum to assist members in European countries to improve their fiscal functionality. The IOTA headquarters are located in Budapest.

History
Members include organizations and ministries who assist tax subjects (citizens) for the various governments across Europe. The body was organised as a result of the Conference of Tax Administrations of Central and Eastern Europe and Baltic Countries (CEEB), held between 28–30 October 1996, in Warsaw. The formation was supported by the European Union, the International Monetary Fund, the OECD, CIAT and the United States.

Membership
The following states are full members of the Intra-European Organisation of Tax Administrations:

Associated members include:

See also

 Economy of Europe
 Inter-American Center of Tax Administrations
 List of countries by tax rates
 List of countries by tax revenue to GDP ratio

References

External links
 Webpage of the IOTA
 IOTA on Facebook

International taxation
Tax organizations
Tax administration
Intergovernmental organizations